Iron Man is an album by American jazz multi-instrumentalist Eric Dolphy, recorded in 1963 and released by the Douglas International label in 1968. The album was reissued on disc two of Musical Prophet: The Expanded 1963 New York Studio Sessions, released in 2018 by Resonance Records.

Recording 
The music on Iron Man was recorded during two dates arranged by Alan Douglas: a July 1, 1963 session featuring just Dolphy and bassist Richard Davis, and a July 3 session with nearly a dozen musicians. The July 1 session produced "Come Sunday" and "Ode to Charlie Parker" and another track, "Alone Together", which appeared on the album Conversations. An alternate version of "Alone Together", along with two previously-unreleased versions of a tune written by Roland Hanna titled "Muses for Richard Davis", also recorded that day, appeared on Musical Prophet: The Expanded 1963 New York Studio Sessions. 

The remaining three tracks on Iron Man were recorded during the July 3 session, which also yielded the tracks "Jitterbug Waltz", "Music Matador", and "Love Me", released on Conversations. Alternate takes of most of the July 3 pieces can be found on Musical Prophet. Alternate versions of five of the pieces recorded on both July dates also appeared on the 2013 Japanese release Muses.

The album liner notes state:

The July sessions marked the recorded debut of trumpeter Woody Shaw, who was eighteen at the time.

Reception

In an AllMusic review, Steve Huey wrote that, compared to Conversations, "Iron Man is every bit as essential and strikes a more consistent ambience than its widely varied twin. It also more clearly anticipates the detailed, abstract sound paintings of Dolphy's masterwork Out to Lunch, in large part because this time around the program is weighted toward Dolphy originals." He called the recordings "classic sessions" and stated that they "constitute some of the most brilliant work of the early-'60s avant-garde."

The authors of the Penguin Guide to Jazz Recordings commented: "Iron Man is... valuable for two fine duets with Richard Davis and for glimpses of Dolphy playing with the ill-fated Woody Shaw, a desperately underrated but unforgivably prodigal trumpeter whose recorded legacy is only a fraction of what it ought to be."

Dolphy biographers Vladimir Simosko and Barry Tepperman called "Burning Spear" "a tantalizing example of the kind of arranging Dolphy must have been capable of turning out", and wrote that "Iron Man" is "an especially strong, vital performance."

Track listing
Side 1:
 "Iron Man" – 9:07
 "Mandrake" – 4:50
 "Come Sunday" (Ellington) – 6:24
Side 2: 
 "Burning Spear" – 11:49
 "Ode to Charlie Parker" (Byard) – 8:05

All songs composed by Dolphy except as noted.

Personnel
Eric Dolphy – bass clarinet, flute, alto saxophone
Richard Davis – bass
Clifford Jordan – soprano saxophone
Sonny Simmons – alto saxophone
Prince Lasha – flute
Woody Shaw – trumpet
Bobby Hutcherson – vibes
Eddie Khan – bass ("Iron Man")
J.C. Moses – drums

References

1963 albums
Eric Dolphy albums
Albums produced by Alan Douglas (record producer)
Albums with cover art by Mati Klarwein